Great America station is a light rail station operated by Santa Clara Valley Transportation Authority (VTA). Great America is served by the Orange and Green light rail lines. Great America is named for the nearby California's Great America theme park and is the closest station to Levi's Stadium, home of the San Francisco 49ers.

From the station platforms, the entrance to Levi's Stadium is a  walk and the entrance to the Great America theme park is a  walk.

Improvements were made to the station ahead of the July 2014 opening of Levi's Stadium, including adding an “event only” side platform south of the eastbound track. During normal operations, this platform is not used and gates prevent access. After the end of a game, the platform is opened and used for eastbound and southbound departures, while the normal island platform is used only for westbound departures. During very busy events, the new platform has multiple gates, and customers are asked to queue in different lines based on their destination to facilitate rapid loading of trains.

A pocket track was also added between the Reamwood and Old Ironsides stations, enabling the storage of three, 3-car trains to mobilize trains quickly after the end of an event at Levi's Stadium.

Service

Station layout

Location 
The station is located in the median of Tasman Drive between the Santa Clara Convention Center and California's Great America. It is also across the street from the San Francisco 49ers home, Levi's Stadium.

References

External links 

Santa Clara Valley Transportation Authority light rail stations
Santa Clara Valley Transportation Authority bus stations
1987 establishments in California
Railway stations in the United States opened in 1987